Associação Atlética Flamengo, commonly referred to as Flamengo de Guarulhos, is a Brazilian professional football club based in Guarulhos, São Paulo. The team competes in the Paulista Segunda Divisão, the fourth tier of the São Paulo state football league.

The club was founded on June 1, 1954.

History
The club won the Campeonato Paulista Segunda Divisão B2 in 1999, the Campeonato Paulista Série B in 2000, and the Campeonato Paulista Série A3 in 2008.

Achievements
 Campeonato Paulista Série A3
 Winners (1): 2008
 Campeonato Paulista Série B
 Winners (1): 2000
Campeonato Paulista Segunda Divisão B2
 Winners (1): 1999

Stadium
Associação Atlética Flamengo play their home games at Estádio Antônio Oliveira. The stadium has a maximum capacity of 15,000 people.

References

External links
 Official website

 
Association football clubs established in 1954
Football clubs in São Paulo (state)
1954 establishments in Brazil